Arkadelphia is a city in Clark County, Arkansas, United States. As of the 2020 census, the population was 10,380. The city is the county seat of Clark County. It is situated at the foothills of the Ouachita Mountains. Two universities, Henderson State University and Ouachita Baptist University, are located here. Arkadelphia was incorporated in 1857.

History 
The site was settled in about 1809 by John Hemphill, operator of a nearby salt works, Arkansas's first industry. It was known as Blakelytown until 1839, when the settlement adopted the name Arkadelphia. The town was named "Arkadelphia," a portmanteau of Ark- from the state's name Arkansas and adelphia from the Greek meaning "brother/place".

Arkadelphia was once known as the "City of Rainbows", perhaps because the humid climate often resulted in rain.

Geography 
Arkadelphia is located in northeastern Clark County at  (34.121920, -93.066178), on the west bank of the Ouachita River.

Climate 
The climate is characterized by hot, humid summers and generally mild to cool winters. According to the Köppen climate classification system, Arkadelphia has a humid subtropical climate, abbreviated "Cfa" on climate maps.

Demographics

2020 census

As of the 2020 United States census, there were 10,380 people, 3,751 households, and 1,966 families residing in the city.

2010 census
As of the 2010 United States Census, there were 10,714 people living in the city. The racial makeup of the city was 64.0% White, 30.0% Black, 0.4% Native American, 0.8% Asian, <0.1% Pacific Islander, 0.1% from some other race and 1.4% from two or more races. 3.2% were Hispanic or Latino of any race.

2000 census
As of the census of 2000, there were 10,912 people, 3,865 households, and 2,187 families living in the city. The racial makeup of the city was 68.98% White, 26.51% Black or African American, 0.53% Native American, 1.29% Asian, 0.05% Pacific Islander, 1.35% from other races, and 1.28% from two or more races. Hispanic or Latino of any race were 2.59% of the population.

There were 3,865 households, out of which 27.0% had children under the age of 18 living with them, 38.6% were married couples living together, 15.3% had a female householder with no husband present, and 43.4% were non-families. 31.7% of all households were made up of individuals, and 13.7% had someone living alone who was 65 years of age or older.  The average household size was 2.26 and the average family size was 2.87.

In the city, the age distribution of the population showed 18.1% under the age of 18, 32.9% from 18 to 24, 20.4% from 25 to 44, 14.5% from 45 to 64, and 14.1% who were 65 years of age or older. The median age was 24 years. For every 100 females, there were 85.6 males. For every 100 females age 18 and over, there were 82.4 males.

The median income for a household in the city was $26,651, and the median income for a family was $42,479. Males had a median income of $30,152 versus $19,459 for females. The per capita income for the city was $13,268.  About 19.8% of families and 23.2% of the population were below the poverty line, including 25.8% of those under the age of 18 and 15.9% of those 65 and older.

Economy 
Major factors in Arkadelphia's economy are education and manufacturing. Ouachita Baptist University, Henderson State University, and Arkadelphia School District employ many people in the education sector. The manufacturing sector includes Georgia Pacific and Siplast. The economy includes small-scale businesses, including fast-food restaurants.

Arts and culture 

Opened in 2011, the Arkadelphia Arts Center hosts exhibits, productions and educational workshops for many organizations in town, including the Caddo River Art Guild, the Poet and Writer's Guild, the Little Theatre, the two universities, and Arkadelphia School District. Henderson State University holds plays and musical performances in Arkansas Hall located on campus. Ouachita Baptist University displays student art and sculpture in the Hammons Gallery. OBU performing arts take place in the OBU Jones Performing Arts Center on Ouachita Street.

Tourism 

The Clark County Historical Museum contains artifacts from prehistoric times through today in an attempt to document the history of the county. Based in the former Amtrak station, a historic tour through Arkadelphia, including the historic James E. M. Barkman House. The Captain Henderson House is a historic bed and breakfast owned and operated by Henderson State University and originally inhabited by the university's namesake.

Downtown Arkadelphia includes the Arkadelphia Commercial Historic District, the Arkadelphia Confederate Monument, Clark County Courthouse, and the Clark County Library, all listed on the National Register of Historic Places.

Other family attractions include the Diamond Lakes Regional Visitors Center on Highway 7 near I-30, and the Reynolds Science Center Planetarium, open to the public during the academic year, is located on the Henderson State University campus.

Parks and recreation 
Arkadelphia Parks and Recreation Department operates facilities and manages activities for the community. Within Feaster Park, the department operates Arkadelphia Aquatic Park, which features water slides, swimming, and diving areas. The park includes a recreation center that has an indoor basketball/volleyball court, a weight lifting area and an elevated walking track. In 2013, the department completed construction of DeSoto Bluff Trail, which overlooks the Ouachita River.

The state park has facilities for camping, fishing, water sports, golf, hiking, and biking.

The Caddo and Ouachita rivers merge just outside the northern city limits. Canoe and tube rentals are available in nearby Caddo Valley, Arkansas.

The lake is surrounded by Ouachita National Forest. The tourist destination of Hot Springs is located adjacent to the national park. Bathhouse Row, Oaklawn Park Race Track and Casino and Magic Springs are some attractions located there.

Government 

Arkadelphia operates under the city manager form of government. There is a seven-member city council known as the board of directors that appoint the city manager. Five members of the board are elected via ward. Two members are elected at large, one of which is the mayor position.

Education

Colleges and universities 
 Henderson State University is a public liberal arts, undergraduate institution that is a member of the Council of Public Liberal Arts Colleges. The university was founded as Arkadelphia Methodist College in 1890, and was renamed Henderson-Brown College before it became a public institution in 1929. Its current name was adopted in 1975. In 2021, Henderson State University joined the Arkansas State University System.
 Ouachita Baptist University is a private, liberal arts, undergraduate institution that is affiliated with the Arkansas Baptist State Convention. The university was founded as Ouachita Baptist College in 1886, and its current designation was established in 1965.

Secondary schools

Public schools 
Arkadelphia School District operates five public schools:
 Central Primary School
 Louisa E. Perritt Primary School
 Peake Elementary School
 Goza Middle School
 Arkadelphia High School

For the 2011–2012 school year, there were approximately 2,125 students enrolled. In September 2015, voters in the Arkadelphia School District passed a millage increase earmarked for new elementary and middle schools. Dr. Donnie Whitten is District Superintendent.

Private schools 
 Clark County Christian Academy. K4 through 12th grade.

Historic schools 
 Arkansas Institute for the Blind was located in Arkadelphia from 1859–1868.

Infrastructure

Healthcare 
Major medical services in Arkadelphia are provided by:
 Baptist Health Medical Center-Arkadelphia – a Hospital which provides a wide variety of services, including the 'Arkadelphia Medical Clinic', and a Women's Health Clinic.
 CHI St. Vincent Heart Clinic Arkansas – provider of specialized Cardiology services.
 The Surgical Clinic of Central Arkansas – a comprehensive General Surgery provider.
 Baptist Health Orthopaedic Clinic – General, sports, and joint replacement.

Transportation

Major highways 
  Interstate 30
  U.S. Highway 67
  Arkansas Highway 7
  Arkansas Highway 8
  Arkansas Highway 51
  Arkansas Highway 874

US Route 67 runs parallel to I-30 and connects Arkadelphia to Malvern  to the northeast and Gurdon  to the southwest. Highway 8 and Arkansas Highway 51 serve as primary east-west arterials for Arkadelphia. Arkansas Highway 7 provides a primary north-south route and has been designated as an Arkansas Scenic Byway. Arkansas Highway 874 is a system of state highways that serve Henderson State University.

Rail 
Passenger rail service is provided by Amtrak's Texas Eagle, which stops at Arkadelphia station. Trains run daily between Chicago and San Antonio. Connecting service between San Antonio and Los Angeles is available three times a week via the Sunset Limited.

Freight service in Arkadelphia is provided by Arkansas Midland Railroad and the Union Pacific Railroad.

Aviation 

Dexter B. Florence Memorial Field (KADF) in southeastern Arkadelphia can serve small business jets as well as single and double-engine aircraft. Henderson State University offers a four-year bachelor of science degree in aviation and is responsible for the airport's fixed-base operation.

Public transportation 
Within the city, bus service is provided by South Central Arkansas Transit. (SCAT)

Utilities 
Water and sewer utilities are provided by Arkadelphia's municipal water & wastewater system. The city's electric system is maintained by South Central Arkansas Electric Cooperative, Inc., and natural gas is provided by CenterPoint Energy.

Notable people 
 Harley Bozeman, Arkadelphia native, politician, and confidant of Huey and Earl Long
 Trent Bryant, cornerback for NFL's Washington Redskins and Kansas City Chiefs, and CFL's Saskatchewan Roughriders
 V. L. Cox, nationally known artist, grew up in Arkadelphia.
 Chad Griffin, youngest member of the White House Clinton staff at 19; grew up in Arkadelphia 
 Cliff Harris, safety for the Dallas Cowboys, two-time Super Bowl champion; attended college in Arkadelphia
 Cecil Ivory (1921-1961), Presbyterian minister and civil rights leader born in Arkadelphia
 Percy Malone, Arkansas politician and pharmacist
 W. Francis McBeth, first Composer Laureate of Arkansas
 Beth Moore, evangelist and Bible teacher; founder of Living Proof Ministries
 Terry Nelson, tight end for Los Angeles Rams in Super Bowl XIV; born in Arkadelphia
 Tommy Patterson, NBA player for Washington Bullets; attended college in Arkadelphia.
 Jim Ranchino (1936–1978), political scientist, consultant and pollster
 Bob C. Riley (1924–1994), former governor of Arkansas
 Nick Tennyson, two-term mayor of Durham, North Carolina from 1997–2001
 Kevin Williams (b. 1980), defensive tackle for NFL's Minnesota Vikings, Seattle Seahawks and New Orleans Saints; born in Arkadelphia
 Winston P. Wilson (1911-1996), United States Air Force Major General and Chief of the National Guard Bureau

See also 

 List of cities and towns in Arkansas
 National Register of Historic Places listings in Clark County, Arkansas

References

External links 

City website
Arkadelphia Area Chamber of Commerce
 Encyclopedia of Arkansas History & Culture entry: Arkadelphia (Clark County)

 
1857 establishments in Arkansas
Arkansas placenames of Native American origin
Cities in Arkansas
Cities in Clark County, Arkansas
County seats in Arkansas
Ouachita Mountains
Populated places established in 1857
Arkansas populated places on the Ouachita River